Scedella cyana is a species of tephritid or fruit flies in the genus Scedella of the family Tephritidae.

Distribution
Sierra Leone.

References

Tephritinae
Insects described in 1849
Diptera of Africa